Scalmatica constrata is a moth of the family Tineidae first described by Edward Meyrick in 1919. It is found in Sri Lanka.

References

Moths of Asia
Moths described in 1919
Myrmecozelinae